Algeria competed at the 2015 World Championships in Athletics in Beijing, China, from 22 to 30 August 2015.

Results
(q – qualified, NM – no mark, SB – season best)

Men
Track and road events

Combined events – Decathlon

Women
Track and road events

References

Nations at the 2015 World Championships in Athletics
World Championships in Athletics
Algeria at the World Championships in Athletics